Máire Toner (born 1 April 1992) is a Northern Ireland netball international. She represented Northern Ireland at the 2014 Commonwealth Games. She was also a member of the Northern Ireland team that were silver medallists at the 2012 European Netball Championship.  Her older sister, Fionnuala Toner, is also a Northern Ireland netball international.

Early life, family and education
Toner was raised in the Malone Road district of Belfast. Her older sister, Fionnuala Toner, is also a Northern Ireland netball international. Between 2003 and 2010 Máire attended Our Lady and St Patrick's College. Between 2010 and 2011 she attended Kent School. Between 2011 and 2014 she attended Queen's University where she studied Law and Politics. As well as playing netball, Toner also played basketball for both Our Lady and St Patrick's College and Queen's University.

Playing career

Clubs
Belfast Ladies
At club level Toner played for Belfast Ladies.

Northern Ireland
Toner represented Northern Ireland at under-17 and under-21 levels. She captained the under-21 team. Toner made her senior debut for Northern Ireland in 2012. She subsequently represented Northern Ireland at the 2014 Commonwealth Games. She was also a member of the Northern Ireland team that were silver medallists at the 2012 European Netball Championship.

Occupation
Since 2017 Toner has worked as a solicitor for Clifford Chance.

Honours
Northern Ireland
European Netball Championship
Runner up: 2012

References 

1992 births
Living people
Northern Ireland netball internationals
Netball players at the 2014 Commonwealth Games
Commonwealth Games competitors for Northern Ireland
Sportspeople from Belfast
Irish women's basketball players
Irish expatriate sportspeople in England
Solicitors from Northern Ireland
People educated at Our Lady and St. Patrick's College, Knock
Kent School alumni
Alumni of Queen's University Belfast